William Barlow House (or Barlow House) is a historic building in Clackamas County, Oregon, United States.

Barlow House was home to William Barlow, namesake of the city of Barlow and son of Samuel K. Barlow, who built the Barlow Road.  The house is located south of Barlow, between Canby and Aurora on 99E.  It was built in an Italianate style in 1885,
and listed on the National Register of Historic Places on February 15, 1977.  It now operates as a privately owned museum and is open by appointment.

References

External links 

 Historic Barlow House - Touring information
 Photo of Barlow House taken in 1885

1885 establishments in Oregon
Historic house museums in Oregon
Houses completed in 1885
Houses in Clackamas County, Oregon
Houses on the National Register of Historic Places in Oregon
Italianate architecture in Oregon
Museums in Clackamas County, Oregon
National Register of Historic Places in Clackamas County, Oregon